The 25th Metro Manila Film Festival was held in Manila, Philippines starting December 25.

Once again, GMA Films received most of the awards for the film Muro-Ami, which won thirteen awards in the 1999 Metro Manila Film Festival including the Best Picture, Gatpuno Antonio J. Villegas Cultural Awards and Best Director for second consecutive time winner Marilou Diaz-Abaya among others. Meanwhile, Viva Films' Bulaklak ng Maynila received five awards including the Best Actor for fifth-time winner Christopher de Leon, Best Actress for Elizabeth Oropesa and the Second Best Picture Award. The Third Best Picture Award goes to Regal Films' Sa Piling ng mga Aswang while the Best Float during the festival's parade goes to Millennium Films' Pepeng Agimat.

Entries

Winners and nominees

Awards
Winners are listed first and highlighted in boldface.

Multiple awards

Box Office gross
Final figures as of January 3, 2000.

References

External links

Metro Manila Film Festival
MMFF
MMFF